Aulostomoidei is a superfamily of the order Syngnathiformes, which also contains groups such as the seahorses, pipefishes and dragonets. It is one of two superfamilies which make up the suborder Aulostomoidei within the Syngnathiformes.

Families
There are two families within the Aulostomoidea and they are:

 Aulostomidae (trumpetfishes)
 Fistularidae (cornetfishes)

Other authorities subsume the Aulostomoidea into the "long-snouted clade" which makes up the suborder Syngnathoidei .

References

Syngnathiformes